Durval Lélys (born December 6, 1957) is a Brazilian musician, singer-songwriter, multi-instrumentalist and lyricist. He is best known as the frontman of the Salvador (Brazil)-based axé band Asa de Águia. Durval is well known as being one of the main personas from the Brazilian carnival.

Before starting his professional music career, he got a Bachelor's degree in Architecture from Federal University of Bahia (UFBA). He has sculpting and a designing as side activities. On his leisure time his an avid surfer and practitioner of SwáSthya Yôga. Durval is married and has two children.

1957 births
Living people
20th-century Brazilian male singers
20th-century Brazilian singers
People from Salvador, Bahia
Brazilian male guitarists
Axé singers
Brazilian male singer-songwriters